Callionymus draconis, the Japanese spiny dragonet, is a species of dragonet native to temperate regions of the Indian and Pacific oceans around Japan and western Australia where it occurs at depths of around .  This species grows to a length of  SL.

References 

D
Taxa named by Tetsuji Nakabo
Fish described in 1977